The women's 4 x 400 metres relay at the 2011 IPC Athletics World Championships was held at the QEII Stadium on 27 January 2011.

Medalists

T53/54
T53 = normal upper limb function, no abdominal, leg or lower spinal function.

T54 = normal upper limb function, partial to normal trunk function, may have significant function of the lower limbs.

Results

Final

Key:   WR = World Record, AR = Continental Record

References
Complete Results Book from the 2011 IPC Athletics World Championships
Official site of the 2011 IPC Athletics World Championships

4 x 400 metres relay
2011 in women's athletics
4 × 400 metres relay at the World Para Athletics Championships